Jabir ibn Abdullah is the name of:
Jabir ibn Abd-Allah (c. 607 – c. 697), a prominent companion of Muhammad and his descendants, the Shi'a Imams
Jaber I Al-Sabah (1770–1859), son of Abdullah bin Sabah